Cirac Valley is a valley, located in the Battle Mountain District, in Esmeralda County, Nevada, United States. It covers an land area of 23,940 acres.

Geography 
The area is located west of the Royston hills, east of the Cedar Mountains, and 30 miles northwest away from Tonopah. The valley is managed by the Bureau of Land Management's Battle Mountain District Office.

On the west part of the area, rhyolite exposures can be found, as well as summits, and a rock canyon system. The elevation of the valley ranges between 3550 feet and 6300 feet. In the west part of the unit, the Outlaw Springs can be found, which provide enough water for the wildlife to thrive in the area.

Flora and Fauna 
The geographical area mainly moderated by natural wild forces and is characterized by plants such as blackbrush, cholla, and saltbrush.

The eastern parts of the area are characterized with a sandy soil which predisposes the growth of greasewood. Bighorn sheep can be found near the borders of the Cedar mountain. Wild horses, pronghorn and burros are also frequent in the area.

Stargazing 
The valley is far from towns and city lights, which makes it a good spot for star gazing at night.

References 

Valleys of Esmeralda County, Nevada